Digital poetry is a form of electronic literature, displaying a wide range of approaches to poetry, with a prominent and crucial use of computers. Digital poetry can be available in form of CD-ROM, DVD, as installations in art galleries, in certain cases also recorded as digital video or films, as digital holograms, on the World Wide Web or Internet, and as mobile phone apps.

A significant portion of current publications of poetry are available either only online or via some combination of online and offline publication. There are many types of 'digital poetry' such as hypertext, kinetic poetry, computer generated animation, digital visual poetry, interactive poetry, code poetry, holographic poetry (holopoetry), experimental video poetry, and poetries that take advantage of the programmable nature of the computer to create works that are interactive, or use generative or combinatorial approach to create text (or one of its states), or involve sound poetry, or take advantage of things like listservs, blogs, and other forms of network communication to create communities of collaborative writing and publication (as in poetical wikis).

Digital platforms allow the creation of art that spans different media: text, images, sounds, and interactivity via programming. Contemporary poetries have, therefore, taken advantage of this toward the creation of works that synthesize both arts and media. Whether a work is poetry or visual art or music or programming is sometimes not clear, but we expect an intense engagement with language in poetical works.

History
Early digital poems include Christopher Strachey's love letter generator (1952), the stochastic texts which were indirectly produced by the German mathematician Theo Lutz in 1959 by programming a Z22 of Konrad Zuse; Nanni Balestrini's "Tape Mark I" in Italian, published in 1961; and Brion Gysin's English permutation poems from around 1959, done automatically with the collaboration of Ian Somerville. These and other early digital poems are discussed in C. T. Funkhouser's Prehistoric Digital Poetry.

Hypertext poetry
Hypertext poetry is a form of digital poetry that uses links using hypertext mark-up. It is a very visual form, and is related to hypertext fiction and visual arts. The links mean that a hypertext poem has no set order, the poem moving or being generated in response to the links that the reader/user chooses.  It can either involve set words, phrases, lines, etc. that are presented in variable order but sit on the page much as traditional poetry does, or it can contain parts of the poem that move and / or mutate. It is usually found online, though CD-ROM and diskette versions exist. The earliest examples date to no later than the mid 1980s.

Interactive poetry
Interactive poetry is a form of digital poetry by which the reader may or must contribute to the content, form, or performance of the work, thereby influencing the meaning and experience of the poem. Interaction allows the reader to participate and influence the work and their experience of it.

Interactive poetry is limited to a digital medium as it cannot perform the same function in other media such as print, which limits accessibility. Interactive poetry can also provide a different experience with each reading or from reader to reader and so analysis of this type of poetry can be challenging as the experience is not static.

Notable people

See also
 Code poetry
 
 Cybertext
 Electronic literature
 Electronic Literature Organization
 Electronic Poetry Center
Digital art
Electronic art
New media art

References

Bibliography
AAVV, La coscienza luccicante. Dalla videoarte all’arte interattiva, Gangemi, Roma 1998
Jean-Pierre BALPE, "L'Ordinateur, sa muse", in "Pratiques" nº 39, Metz 1984
Jean-Pierre BALPE, "La position de l'auteur dans la génération automatique de textes à orientations littéraires", in "Lynx" nº 17, Université de Paris-X Nanterre, Nanterre, 1987
Friedrich W. BLOCK, Christiane HEIBACH, Karin WENZ (eds.), p0es1s. The Aesthetics of Digital Poetry, Ostfildern-Ruit, Hatje Cantz, 2004 (German, English)
Wayne CLEMENTS. "Poetry Beyond the Turing Test", Electronic Visualisation and the Arts (EVA 2016)
Caterina DAVINIO, “Parole virtuali. La poesia video-visiva tra arte elettronica e avanguardia”, in "Doc(K)s. Un notre web” (libro e CD), serie 3, 21, 22, 23, 24, Ajaccio (F) 1999
Caterina DAVINIO, "Scritture/Realtà virtuali" in "Doc(K)s" (web), 2000
Caterina DAVINIO, Tecno-Poesia e realtà virtuali (Techno-Poetry and Virtual Reality), essay with preface by Eugenio Miccini (Italian/English), Mantova, Sometti, 2002.
Sergei A. DEMCHENKOV, Dmitriy M. FEDYAEV, Natalya D. FEDYAEVA, "Autopoet" Project: a Semantic Anomalies Generator or a New Existence Creator? in "Astra Salvensis" Vol. 6. Supplement 1, ASTRA, 2018. P. 639-646
Tina Escaja, "Escritura tecnetoesquelética e hipertexto en poetas contemporáneas en la red.” in Espéculo (Universidad Complutense de Madrid). 24 (Julio-Octubre), 2003 
Chris T. FUNKHOUSER, Prehistoric Digital Poetry, An Archeology of Forms, 1959–1995, Tuscaloosa, The University of Alabama Press, 2007
Loss Pequeño GLAZIER, Digital Poetics: The Making of E-Poetries, Tuscaloosa, The University of Alabama Press, 2002
Eduardo KAC, New Media Poetry: Poetic Innovation and New Technologies, "Visible Language" Vol. 30, No. 2, Rhode Island School of Design, 1996.
Eduardo KAC, Hodibis Potax, Édition Action Poétique, Ivry-sur-Seine (France) and Kibla, Maribor (Slovenia), 2007.
Eduardo KAC, Media Poetry: an International Anthology (Second Edition), Bristol: Intellect, 2007.
Eduardo KAC, Telepresence, Biotelematics, Transgenic art, Association for Culture and Education, Maribor 2000

George P. LANDOW.  Hypertext 2.0.  2nd ed.  Baltimore: Johns Hopkins UP, 1997.
Naji, Jeneen. Digital Poetry. Palgrave Macmillan, 2021. 
Philadelpho MENEZES, Poetics and Visuality, translation Harry Polkinhorn, San Diego State University Press, 1995.
Philadelpho MENEZES, Poesia Concreta e Visual, São Paulo, Ática, 1998.
Philadelpho MENEZES(org.), Poesia Sonora: poéticas experimentais da voz no século XX, São Paulo: EDUC (Editora da PUC), 1992.
Philadelpho MENEZES, "Poesia Visual: reciclagem e inovação", em revista Imagens, número 6, Campinas, Editora da Unicamp, 1996, pp. 39/48.
Philadelpho MENEZES, "Poetics and new technologies of communication: a semiotic approach" in Face - Revista de Semiótica e Comunicação, D.1, 1998, site: www.pucsp.br/~cos-puc/face
Kenneth MEYER, “Dramatic narrative in Virtual Reality”, in Frank BIOCCA e Mark R. LEVY (eds.), Communication in the Age of Virtual Reality, Hillsdale, New Jersey, Lawrence Erlbaum, 1995, pp. 219/259.
Janet MURRAY, Hamlet on the Holodeck – The future of narrative in Cyberspace, Cambridge, MIT Press, 1997.
Tom O'Connor, Poetic Acts & New Media, Lanham MD: University Press of America, 2006.
Walter J. ONG, Orality and literacy – The technologizing of the word, Londres, Routledge, 1989.
Cynthia D.  SHIRKEY. “E-poetry: Digital Frontiers for an Evolving Art Form.”  C&RL News 64.4 (April 2003).
Janez Strehovec. Text as Ride. Morgentown. West Virginia UP (Computing Literature), 2016.
Eric VOS. "New Media poetry - Theory and Strategies" in : Eduardo KAC (ed.), New Media Poetry: Poetic Innovation and New Technologies, "Visible Language" Vol. 30, No. 2, Rhode Island School of Design, 1996.

External links
 ELMCIP Electronic Literature Knowledge Base
 Dichtung Digital - journal für digitale ästhetik
 The Digital Aphorisms of Rip Kungler
 Cyberarts Web, with discussions, definitions and links
 E-Poetry Festivals Portal Page
 Electronic Poetry Center, SUNY Buffalo
 New Media Poetry and Poetics Leonardo Electronic Almanac 14 5-6 (2006)
 New Media Poetry, Hypertext and Experimental Literature Bibliography
 Toto Poetry A Digital Poetry Dictionary authored by Computers

Poetry movements
Electronic literature
20th-century literature
21st-century literature